The 2006–2007 LEB season was the 11th season of the Liga Española de Baloncesto, second tier of the Spanish basketball.

Standings

LEB Playoffs

Playoff seedings, results, and schedules

Quarter-finals

(1) Alerta Cantabria (23-11) vs. (8) Ciudad de Huelva (18-16)
 Ciudad de Huelva win the series 1-3 
Game 1 May 3 @ Santander: Alerta Cantabria 74, Ciudad de Huelva 67
Game 2 May 5 @ Santander: Alerta Cantabria 69, Ciudad de Huelva 78
Game 3 May 8 @ Huelva: Ciudad de Huelva 80, Alerta Cantabria 76
Game 4 May 10 @ Huelva: Ciudad de Huelva 76, Alerta Cantabria 74

(4) Villa de Los Barrios (20-14) vs. (5) Ricoh Manresa (19-15)
 Ricoh Manresa win the series 0-3 
Game 1 May 3 @ Los Barrios: Villa de Los Barrios 67, Ricoh Manresa 74
Game 2 May 5 @ Los Barrios: Villa de Los Barrios 69, Ricoh Manresa 72
Game 3 May 8 @ Manresa: Ricoh Manresa 90, Villa de Los Barrios 80

(2) Climalia León (22-12) vs. (7) Palma Aqua Magica (19-15)
 Climalia León win the series 3-2  
Game 1 May 3 @ León: Climalia León 87, Palma Aqua Magica 62
Game 2 May 5 @ León: Climalia León 99, Palma Aqua Magica 77
Game 3 May 8 @ Palma de Mallorca: Palma Aqua Magica 94, Climalia León 89
Game 4 May 10 @ Palma de Mallorca: Palma Aqua Magica 92, Climalia León 66
Game 5 May 12 @ León: Climalia León 85, Palma Aqua Magica 75

(3) Basket CAI Zaragoza (21-13)  vs. (6) Drac Inca (19-15)
 Basket CAI Zaragoza win the series 3-0
Game 1 May 3 @ Zaragoza: Basket CAI Zaragoza 100, Drac Inca 62
Game 2 May 5 @ Zaragoza: Basket CAI Zaragoza 87, Drac Inca 74
Game 3 May 8 @ Inca: Drac Inca 67, Basket CAI Zaragoza 68

Semifinals
(5) Ricoh Manresa (19-15) vs. (8) Ciudad de Huelva (18-16)
 Ricoh Manresa win the series 3-0
Game 1 17 May @ Manresa: Ricoh Manresa 83, Ciudad de Huelva 64
Game 2 19 May @ Manresa: Ricoh Manresa 85, Ciudad de Huelva 59
Game 3 22 May @ Huelva: Ciudad de Huelva 72, Ricoh Manresa 84
Ricoh Manresa: Promoted to Liga ACB.

(2) Climalia León (22-12) vs. (3) Basket CAI Zaragoza (21-13)
 The series is tied 2-2
Game 1 17 May @ León: Climalia León 89, Basket CAI Zaragoza 75
Game 2 19 May @ León: Climalia León 73, Basket CAI Zaragoza 88
Game 3 22 May @ Zaragoza: Basket CAI Zaragoza 79, Climalia León 73
Game 4 24 May @ Zaragoza: Basket CAI Zaragoza 73, Climalia León 82
Game 5 26 May @ León: Climalia León 89, Basket CAI Zaragoza 79
Climalia León: Promoted to Liga ACB.

LEB Finals
These two teams are already promoted to the league ACB.

(2) Climalia León (22-12) vs. (5) Ricoh Manresa (19-15)
Game 1 June 6 @ León: Climalia León 88, Ricoh Manresa 94
Ricoh Manresa: League LEB CHAMPION
Climalia León and Ricoh Manresa: Promoted to League ACB

Relegation playoffs

Calefacciones Farho Gijón, relegated to LEB Plata.

TV coverage
Teledeporte, FEBTV, Popular TV, Canal 33 and autonomous channels.

See also 
Liga Española de Baloncesto

External links
Official Schedule and Results

LEB Oro seasons
LEB2
Second level Spanish basketball league seasons